Georgian calligraphy is a form of calligraphy, or artistic writing of the Georgian language using its three Georgian scripts.

History

Georgia has a centuries-old tradition of a calligraphic school. Hand-written books from the early centuries became a cultural and a national phenomenon in Georgia. Christianity had played an enormous role in Georgian literature life since the Georgian Orthodox Church and its monks contributed their life to the Georgian writing by creating manuscripts and all the historical records for the Georgian nation.

Every year on April 14, Georgia celebrates the "Day of Georgian language". On this day the calligraphy contests are held, the winners are named and awards are given to the best calligraphers at the Georgian National Center of Manuscripts.

Georgian calligraphy was actively created outside Georgia as well. Georgians created calligraphical, religious and scholar works in the following places: Georgian-built Petritsoni monastery of Bulgaria, Iviron monastery of Mount Athos
and Monastery of the Cross of Jerusalem. They were also active at Mar Saba of Jerusalem, Saint Catherine's Monastery of Mount Sinai, Antioch and Constantinople. Within Georgia, the Kingdom of the Iberians being the cultural center of the country had produced the most excellent masters of the Georgian calligraphy, art, literature and architecture. In 2022, the official "School of Georgian calligraphy" opened in Georgia, that will run courses for future calligraphers and font designers.

Georgian calligraphers

Martviri Sabatsmindeli (6th century)
Basili Sabatsmindeli (8th century)
Mikaeli (9th century)
Makari of Leteti (9th century)
Giorgi Merchule (10th century)
Stephen of Tbeti (10th century)
Mikael Modrekili (10th century)
Euthymius of Athos (10th century)
John the Iberian (10th century)
Bagrat II of Tao (10th century)
Gabrieli (calligrapher) (10th century)
Gabriel Patarai (10th century)
Ioane-Zosime (10th century)
Ioane Berai (10th century)
George the Hagiorite (11th century)
Mikael Mtserali (11th century)
Arsen Ninotsmindeli (11th century)
Basili (11th century)
Mose Khandzteli (11th century)
Ioane Mesvete (11th century)
Iovane Meli (11th century)
Ioane Dvali (11th century)
Giorgi Dvali (11th century)
Shav-Zakaria (11th century)
Iakob Itsrelisdze (11th century)
Iovane Pukaralisdze (12th century)
Arsen of Iqalto (12th century)
Saba Svingelozi (12th century)
Petre Gelateli (12th century)
Iovane Kartveli (12th century)
Ioane (12th century)
Arseni (12th century)
Giorgi Dodisi (12th century)
Giorgi Khutsesmonazoni (12th century)
Nikrai (12–13th century)
Nikoloz Kataratsisdze (13th century)
Epremi (13th century)
Avgaroz Bandaisdze (14th century)
Ambrose (15th–16th centuries)
Nikoloz Cholokashvili (16th century)
Mikadze family (16th–18th centuries)
Kargareteli family (16th–17th centuries)
Magaladze family (17th–18th centuries)
Aleksi-Meskhishvili family (17th–19th centuries)
Bedismtserlishvili family (17th century)
Zaal-Zosime Orbeliani (17th century)
Sulkhan-Saba Orbeliani (17th century)
Mariam-Makrina (17th century)
Demetre I Mgalobeli (17th century)
Mamuka Tavakalashvili (17th century)
Begtabeg Taniashvili (17th century)
Gabriel Saginashvili (17th century)
Givi Tumanishvili (17th century)
Ioseb Tbileli (17th century)
Anthim the Iberian (17th century)
Davit Tumanishvili (18th century)
David the Rector (18th century)
Giorgi Avalishvili (18th century)
Davit Bodbeli Vachnadze (18th century)
Ose Gabashvili (18th century)
Gabriel Mtsire (18th century)
Isaak Mtsire (18th century)
Petre Laradze (18th century)
Nikoloz Sionis Dekanozi (18th century)
Nikoloz Onikashvili (18th century)
Erasti Turkestanishvili (18th century)
Onana Mdivani (18th century)
Ioane Pentelashvili (18th century)
Goderdzi Piralishvili (18th century)
Chachikashvili family (18th–19th centuries)
Alexander Sulkhanishvili (19th century)
Lasha Kintsurashvili (modern)
Niaz Diasamidze (modern)
Levan Chaganava (modern)
Lile Chkhetiani (modern)
Nina Sublatti (modern)
Giorgi Sisauri (modern)
David Maisuradze (modern)
Mariam Tepnadze (modern)
Nika Gunashvili (modern)

Gallery

See also
Khelrtva

References

External links
The Beauty of Georgia
The Beautiful Fonts and Scripts of Georgia
Georgian Calligraphy: About
 produced by Georgian National Center of Manuscripts and Ministry of Education and Science of Georgia
 produced by Imedi TV
საქართველოს კალიგრაფთა კავშირი (Calligraphers Union of Georgia)
კალიგრაფია თუ ფონტი?
ვის აქვს ყველაზე ლამაზი ხელწერა საქართველოში და როგორ გადახატეს „ვეფხისტყაოსნის” აფორიზმები კონკურსანტებმა

 
Western calligraphy